Hoplophanes lithocolleta is a moth of the family Heliozelidae endemic to New South Wales. It was described by Turner in 1916.

References

Moths described in 1916
Heliozelidae